Been There...Sung That! is a studio album by American country music artist Jeannie Seely. It was released in 1999 on Faux Paw Productions and Shadpoke Records. The project was produced by Seely and was her thirteenth studio recording. It was her first studio album release in five years and second to be released on independent record labels. The album featured collaborations with several music artists.

Background and release
Been There...Sung That! was recorded at the Legends Studio, a venue located in Nashville, Tennessee. The project was produced by Seely, making it her second self-produced project. The album consisted of twelve tracks most of which were previously unrecorded by Seely. The record included three collaborations with other performers. The second track, "Old Friends", was recorded with Willie Nelson. The fifth track, "Making Believe", was a duet with Terri Williams. The following track, "I Can't Stop Loving You", was a duet with T. Graham Brown. All of the twelve tracks recorded were cover versions of songs previously recorded by others. Among these songs was "He's All I Need", which Seely composed with Dottie West and it originally appeared on her New Horizons album. Another example of this is the first track, "Leavin' and Sayin' Goodbye". Another original composition by Seely, it was recorded and made a major hit by Faron Young.

Been There...Sung That! was released in 1999. The album originally released as both a compact disc and a cassette. The record was released in conjunction with Faux Paw Productions and Shadpoke Records, which were two companies founded by Seely. The album did not produce any known singles nor did it reach any peak positions on the Billboard music charts.

Track listing

Personnel
All credits are adapted from the liner notes of Been There...Sung That!.

Musical personnel
 T. Graham Brown – background vocals
 Dug Grieves – guitar, rhythm guitar
 Jerry Ray Johnston – drums
 Willie Nelson – background vocals
 Kenny Sears – fiddle
 Jeannie Seely – lead vocals
 Joe Van Dyke – piano, synthesizer
 Terri Williams – background vocals

Technical personnel
 David Boyer – engineering
 Larry Hill – photography
 Jeannie Seely – producer 
 Howard Toole – engineering

Release history

References

1999 albums
Albums produced by Jeannie Seely
Jeannie Seely albums